Symplococarpon purpusii is a plant species of the genus Symplococarpon. It is native from southern Mexico to northern Colombia, occurring in such a large territory is hence presumed to have a large population and listed as Least Concern according to the IUCN Red List. This species of plant can be found in elevations as low as 116 metres and as high as 3,017 metres.

References

Flora of Mexico
Flora of Colombia
Pentaphylacaceae